In March 2015, several children were kidnapped by Boko Haram, apparently during the months-long occupation of the town of Damasak by the group. The Jonathan government was accused of ignoring this incident.

Years later the victims were still unaccounted for.

Notes

References

Boko Haram kidnappings
Kidnappings in Nigeria
Kidnapped Nigerian children